Oberea perspicillata, the raspberry cane borer, is a species of flat-faced longhorn in the beetle family Cerambycidae. It is found in North America.

References

Further reading

External links

 

perspicillata
Articles created by Qbugbot
Beetles described in 1847